Joseph Stevenart (born 20 February 1890, date of death unknown) was a Belgian equestrian. He competed in the individual dressage event at the 1924 Summer Olympics.

References

External links
 

1890 births
Year of death missing
Belgian male equestrians
Belgian dressage riders
Olympic equestrians of Belgium
Equestrians at the 1924 Summer Olympics
Place of birth missing